The 1994 Pan American Race Walking Cup was held in Atlanta, Georgia, United States, on 23–24 September.  The track of the Cup runs in the Georgia Avenue.

Complete results, medal winners until 2011, and the results for the Mexican athletes were published.

Medallists

Results

Men's 20 km

Team

Men's 50 km

Team

Women's 10 km

Team

Participation
The participation of 83 athletes from 11 countries is reported.

 (4)
 (9)
 (10)
 (3)
 (5)
 (5)
 (3)
 (6)
 México (15)
 (2)
 (20)

See also
 1994 Race Walking Year Ranking

References

Pan American Race Walking Cup
Pan American Race Walking Cup
Pan American Race Walking Cup
International track and field competitions hosted by the United States
Track and field in Georgia (U.S. state)
1994 in sports in Georgia (U.S. state)